El Taref is a city in Algeria. It is the capital of El Taref Province. El Kala is a port town near El Taref. El Taref  is 700 kilometers east of Algiers. In 1998, it had a population of around 20,300.

General Electric and Iberdrola are building a power station in El Taref, beginning in mid-2008, a project which will increase Algeria's
energy capacity by 18%.

References

Communes of El Taref Province
Province seats of Algeria
El Taref Province